Prostitute is a 1980 British drama film, the directorial debut of Tony Garnett who also wrote and produced the film.

The film tells the story of Sandra  (Eleanor Forsythe), "an ambitious working girl who moves to London."

Production
Many scenes were shot on location in Balsall Heath, Birmingham's former red-light district.

References

External links

1980 films
British drama films
Films about prostitution in the United Kingdom
1980s English-language films
1980s British films